Devil's Den is on the Civil War battlefield at Gettysburg, Pennsylvania.

Devil's Den may also refer to:

Places

Devil's Den State Park, in West Fork, Arkansas
Devils Den, California, a historic settlement near Salt Spring in Kern County, California
Devil's Den Preserve, in Fairfield County, Connecticut
Devil's Den Cave, in Williston, Florida
Devil's Den Nature Preserve, in Carroll County, Virginia
The Devil's Den, a burial chamber in Wiltshire, Great Britain

Other uses
Devil's Den (film), a 2006 movie directed by Jeff Burr
Devil's Den (game), a board wargame based upon the Civil War fight
 "The Devil's Den", song by Skrillex and Wolfgang Gartner from Bangarang
Devil's Den, a 1948 movie starring Leo Carrillo